Limehouse Causeway is a street in the London Borough of Tower Hamlets, East London that was home to the original Chinatown of London. A combination of bomb damage during the Second World War and later redevelopment means that almost nothing is left of the original buildings of the street.

Location

Limehouse Causeway runs from the junction of Narrow Street and Three Colt Street in the west to Westferry Road in the east. On its northern side it is joined by Gill Street and Salter Street. On the south side it is joined by Milligan Street.

Original "Chinatown"
The street was the home of the original "Chinatown" of London.

Buildings
Most of the buildings in the street are publicly owned housing, built during the first phase of redevelopment after bomb damage was cleared in the 1960s and 1970s. In addition there is the Cyril Jackson Primary School, the Limehouse Youth Centre and some commercial buildings. The Westferry Docklands Light Railway station is located in the street.

See also
History of Chinese immigration to the United Kingdom

References

External links

https://web.archive.org/web/20141112013939/http://untoldlondon.org.uk/articles/read/the_chinese_in_limehouse_1900_-_1940

Streets in the London Borough of Tower Hamlets
Limehouse